Victor François Tardieu (30 April 1870, Orliénas - 12 June 1937, Hanoi) was a French painter; cofounder of what is now known as the Vietnam University of Fine Arts.

Biography 
In 1887, he was admitted to the École nationale des beaux-arts de Lyon. After two years there, he transferred to the Académie Julian in Paris, where he studied for a year. In 1890, he entered the École des beaux-arts de Paris, with the advice and support of Léon Bonnat. He was employed in the workshops of Bonnat and Albert Maignan until 1894. He also collaborated with the stained glass artist; producing a series of glass boxes.

In 1902, he married the harpist, Caroline Luigini, daughter of the composer and conductor, Alexandre Luigini. They had one son, the writer Jean Tardieu.

Shortly after, at the Salon of the Société des artistes français, he won an award that came with a travel grant, allowing him to visit London, Liverpool and Genoa. From 1909 to 1911, he was engaged in painting the ceiling of the Village Hall in Les Lilas. In 1914, he volunteered for service in World War I and worked as a medical orderly in a field hospital near Dunkirk; during which time, he continued to sketch.

After the war, in 1920, he painted another ceiling, in the Town Hall of Montrouge, with a series depicting "Les âges de la vie" (The Ages of Life). That same year, he received the Prix de l'Indochine, and paid a six-month visit to the Far East. Finding himself attracted to the area, he settled in Hanoi the following year. His first work there was a "Canvas of Unity" for the amphitheatre of the University of Indochina.

In 1925, he and his friend, the painter Nguyễn Nam Sơn, created the École des Beaux-Arts de l'Indochine (now the Vietnam University of Fine Arts), where he served as Director until 1936.

His works may be seen at the Musée des beaux-arts de Lyon, the Musée des beaux-arts de Rennes and the Musée de l'Armée.

Selected paintings

References

Further reading 
 Biography and documents @ Cục Mỹ thuật (Department of Fine Arts) 
 Jean-François Luneau, Félix Gaudin - peintre-verrier et mosaïste 1851-1930, Presses Universitaires Blaise-Pascal, 2006 
 Robert Prot, Jean Tardieu et la nouvelle radio, 2006 - 
 Pierre Paliard, Un art vietnamien: penser d'autres modernités Le projet de Victor Tardieu pour l'Ecole des Beaux-Arts de l'Indochine à Hanoï en 1924, Paris, L'Hamattan, 2014

External links 

More works by Tardieu @ ArtNet
"The Camp in the Oatfield", paintings from his military service

1870 births
1937 deaths
People from Rhône (department)
19th-century French painters
French male painters
20th-century French painters
20th-century French male artists
French military personnel of World War I
19th-century French male artists